Mackiewicz is a Polish surname derived from the name Maciek, a diminutive of Maciej (Matthias).  
There are two archaic feminine forms: Mackiewiczowa (for married, literally "Mackiewicz's") and Mackiewiczówna (for unmarried, literally "daughter of Mackiewicz").

Other forms: Lithuanian (transcription from Polish): Mackevič; Lithuanianized: Mackevičius; Belarusian, Russian: Matskevich (transliteration from Cyrillic alphabet); Belarusian (using the Belarusian Latin alphabet or the official Latinization for geographical names): Mackievič.

The surname may refer to:

 Antanas Mackevičius (Polish: Antoni Mackiewicz) (1828-1863), Lithuanian priest 
 Felix Mackiewicz (1917-1993), Major League Baseball outfielder
 Józef Mackiewicz (1902-1985), Polish writer and publicist
 Karol Mackiewicz (born 1992), Polish footballer
 Lech Mackiewicz (born 1960), actor, director, playwright
 Michał Mackiewicz (born 1953), Polish-Lithuanian journalist and politician
 Mieczysław Mackiewicz (1880-1954), Polish general
 Stanisław "Cat" Mackiewicz (1896-1966), Polish political writer
 Tomasz Mackiewicz (1975-2018), Polish mountain climber
 Władysław Mackiewicz, Polish Cavalry Captain
 Maria Kaczyńska (born Maria Mackiewicz), wife of Lech Kaczyński, the President of Poland.

References

Polish-language surnames
Surnames from given names